This is a list of encyclopedias as well as encyclopedic and biographical dictionaries published on the subjects of religion and mythology in any language.

Entries are in the English language unless specifically stated as otherwise.

General religion and mythology 
 Annotated Dictionary of Modern Religious Movements. Grolier, 1993.
 
 Baumgartner, Anne. Ye Gods: A Dictionary of the Gods. Lyle Stuart, 1984.

 Betz, Hans Dieter. Religion in Geschichte und Gegenwart: Handwörterbuch für Theologie und Religionswissenschaft. Mohr, 1998–2000. .
 Betz, Hans Dieter. Religion past & present: Encyclopedia of theology and religion. Brill, 2007–2010. .
 Bishop, Peter and Michael Barton. Encyclopedia of World Faiths: An Illustrated Survey of the World's Living Religions. Facts on File, 1988.
 Bowker, John Westerdale. The Oxford dictionary of world religions. Oxford University Press, 1997. .
 Bradshaw, Paul F. The new Westminster dictionary of liturgy and worship. Westminster John Knox Press, 2002. .
 
 Brasher, Brenda E. Encyclopedia of fundamentalism. Routledge, 2001. .
 
 Carlyon, Richard. Guide to the Gods. Morrow, 1982.
 Cookson, Catharine. Encyclopedia of religious freedom. Routledge, 2003. .
 Cotterell, Arthur. Dictionary of World Mythology. Putnam, 1980; Oxford University Press, 1990.
 
 Douglas, J. D. New 20th-Century Encyclopedia of Religious Knowledge. 2nd ed., Baker Book House, 1991.
 Eliade, Mircea. The Encyclopedia of Religion. Macmillan, 1986.
 Eliade, Mircea and Ioan Couliano. Eliade Guide to World Religions. HarperCollins, 1991.
 Encyclopedic Dictionary of Religion. Catholic University Press, 1979.
 
 Funk & Wagnalls Standard Dictionary of Folklore, Mythology, and Legends. Funk & Wagnalls, 1949–1956.
 
 Guiley, Rosemary, John Zaffis. The encyclopedia of demons and demonology. Facts On File/Checkmark Books, 2009. .
 Harris, Ian. Contemporary Religions: A World Guide, Longman, 1992.
 Harvey, Graham, Robert J. Wallis. Historical dictionary of shamanism. Scarecrow Press, 2007. .
 
 
Hetherington, Norriss S. Encyclopedia of Cosmology: Historical, Philosophical, and Scientific Foundations of Modern Cosmology. Garland, 1993.
 Hinnells, John. Handbook of Living Religions. Viking, 1985.
 Hinnels, John R. A new handbook of living religions. Blackwell, 1997. .
 
 
 Johnston, William M. Recent reference books in religion: A guide for students, scholars, researchers, buyers and readers. InterVarsity Press, 1996. .
 Jones, Lindsay. Encyclopedia of religion. Macmillan Reference USA, 2005. .
 Jordan, Michael. Encyclopedia of Gods: Over 2500 Deities of the World. Facts on File, 1993.

 Kennedy, Richard. International Dictionary of Religion: A Profusely Illustrated Guide to the Beliefs of the World. Crossroad, 1984.
 
 Landes, Richard Allen. Encyclopedia of millennialism and millennial movements. Routledge, 2000. .
 Leach, Marjorie. Guide to the Gods. ABC-Clio, 1992.
 
 Lossky, Nicholas. Dictionary of the ecumenical movement. WCC Publications, c2002.
 Lurker, Manfred. Dictionary of Gods and Goddesses, Devils and Demons. Routledge, 1987.
 Marquis Who's Who. Who's who in religion. Marquis Who's Who, 1975/76-1992/93.
 
 
 
 Melton, J. Gordon, Marin Baumann, David B. Barrett. Religions of the world: A comprehensive encyclopedia of beliefs and practices. ABC-CLIO, 2002. .
 Mercatante, Anthony S. The Facts on File Encyclopedia of World Mythology and Legend. Facts on File, 1988.
 
 Parrinder, Geoffrey. World Religions from Ancient History to the Present. Facts on File, 1984.
 
 Pye, Michael. The Continuum dictionary of religion. Continuum, 1994. .
 
 Riggs, Thomas. Worldmark encyclopedia of religious practices. Thomson Gale, 2006. .
 Salamone, Frank A. Encyclopedia of religious rites, rituals, and festivals. Routledge, 2004. .
 
 
 Smith, Jonathan Z., William Scott Green, Jorunn Jacobsen Buckley. The HarperCollins dictionary of religion. HarperSanFrancisco, 1995. .
 Snodgrass, Mary Ellen. Encyclopedia of world scriptures. McFarland, 2001. .
 Taylor, Patrick, Frederick Ivor Case, Sean Meighoo, Joyce Leung. The encyclopedia of Caribbean religions. University of Illinois Press, 2013. .
 Viller, Marcel, Charles Baumgartner, André Rayez. Dictionnaire de spiritualité ascétique et mystique: Doctrine et histoire. G. Beauchesne et ses fils, 1937–1995.

Agnosticism and atheism 
 Stein, Gordon. The Encyclopedia of Unbelief. Prometheus Books, 1985.

Ancient Greek and Roman religion 
 Bell, Robert. Dictionary of Classical Mythology: Symbols, Attributes & Associations. ABC-Clio, 1982.
 Boardman, John. Lexicon iconographicum mythologiae classicae (LIMC). Artemis, c1981–c1997. .
 Grimal, Pierre. Dictionary of Classical Mythology. Blackwell, 1986.
 Reid, Jane Davidson and Chris Rohman. The Oxford guide to classical mythology in the arts, 1300–1990s. Oxford University Press, 1993. .

Baha'i Faith 
 Adamson, Hugh C. Historical dictionary of the Bahá'í Faith. Scarecrow Press, 2006. .
 Smith, Peter. A concise encyclopedia of the Bahá'í faith. Oneworld, 2000. .

Bible 
 Achtemeier, Paul J. Harper's Bible Dictionary. HarperCollins, 1985.
 Achtemeier, Paul J., Roger S. Boraas. The HarperCollins Bible dictionary. HarperSanFrancisco, 1996. .
 
 Baker Encyclopedia of the Bible. Baker Book House, 1988.
 
 
 
 
 
 
 
 
 
 Coggins, R. J., J. L. Houlden. A Dictionary of biblical interpretation. SCM Press; Trinity Press International, 1990. .
 
 
 
 
 
 
 Ewing, W.. The Temple dictionary of the Bible. Dutton, 1910.
 Freedman, Davie Noel. The Anchor Bible Dictionary. Doubleday, 1992.
 
 Genz, William. Dictionary of Bible and Religion. Abingdon, 1986.
 
 
 
 
 
 
 Hayes, John Haralson. Dictionary of biblical interpretation. Abingdon Press, 1999. .
 Holman Bible Dictionary. Holman, 1991.
 Illustrated Bible Dictionary. Tyndale House, 1980.
 Jacobus, Melanchthon Williams. A standard Bible dictionary.
 Jeffrey, David Lyle. A Dictionary of Biblical Tradition in English Literature. Eerdmans, 1992.
 
 
 Klauck, Hans-Josef. Encyclopedia of the Bible and its reception. Walter de Gruyter, 2009–. .
 
 
 
 
 Metzger, Bruce and Michael D. Coogan. Oxford Companion to the Bible. Oxford University Press, 1993. .
 Meyers, Allen. Eerdman's Bible Dictionary. Eerdmans, 1987.
 
 Mills, Watson. Mercer Dictionary of the Bible. Mercer University Press, 1990.
 
 Neusner, Jacob, William Scott Green.Dictionary of Judaism in the biblical period: 450 B.C.E. to 600 C.E. Macmillan Library Reference, 1996. .
 The new interpreter's dictionary of the Bible. Abingdon Press, 2006–2007. .
 New Unger's Bible Dictionary. rev. ed., Moody, 1988.
 
 
 
 Pfeiffer, Charles F. The Biblical world: A dictionary of Biblical archaeology. Baker Book House, [1966].
 
 
 Richards, Lawrence. Revell's Bible Dictionary. Revell, 1990.
 
 
 
 
 
 
 Wood, D. R. W., I. Howard Marshall, J. D. Douglas. New Bible dictionary. InterVarsity Press, 1996. .
 
 Zondervan Pictorial Encyclopedia of the Bible. Zondervan, 1974.

Biblical archaeology 
 
 
 Cabrol, Fernand, Henri Leclercq, Henri Marrou. Dictionnaire d'archéologie chrétienne et de liturgie. Letouzey et Ané, 1907–[1953].
 
 Negev, Avraham, Shimon Gibson. Archaeological encyclopedia of the Holy Land. Continuum, 2001. .
 
 Stern, Ephraim. The New Encyclopedia of Archaeological Excavations in the Holy Land. rev. ed., Simon & Schuster, 1993.

Buddhism 
 Buswell, Robert E. Encyclopedia of Buddhism. Macmillan Reference USA, 2004. .
 
 Fischer-Schreiber, Ingrid, Stephan Schuhmacher, Gert Woerner. The encyclopedia of Eastern philosophy and religion: Buddhism, Hinduism, Taoism, Zen. Shambhala, 1989. .
 Geaves, Ron.Key words in Hinduism. Georgetown University Press, 2006. .
 
 
 Johnston, William M., Claire Renkin. Encyclopedia of monasticism. Fitzroy Dearborn, 2000. .
 Keown, Damien, Stephen Hodge, Charles Jones. A dictionary of Buddhism. Oxford University Press, 2003. .
 Keown, Damien, Charles S. Prebish. Encyclopedia of Buddhism. Routledge, 2007. .
 Kohn, Michael H., Ingrid Fischer-Schreiber, Franz-Karl Ehrhard. The Shambhala dictionary of Buddhism and Zen. Shambhala, 1991. .
 
 Olson, Carl, Charles S. Prebish. Historical dictionary of Buddhism. Scarecrow Press, 2009. .
 Prebish, Charles S. Historical dictionary of Buddhism. Scarecrow Press, 1993. .
 Senta, Nichiren Shoshu Kokusai. A Dictionary of Buddhist terms and concepts. Nichiren Shoshu International Center, 1983. .
 Snelling, John. The Buddhist handbook: A complete guide to Buddhist schools, teaching, practice, and history. Inner Traditions, 1998. .

Chinese Buddhism

Zen Buddhism 
 Baroni, Helen Josephine. The illustrated encyclopedia of Zen Buddhism. Rosen, 2002. .

Nichiren Buddhism 
 Montgomery, Daniel B. Fire in the lotus : the dynamic Buddhism of Nichiren. Mandala, 1991. .

Chinese religion

Chinese Buddhism

Zen Buddhism 
 Baroni, Helen Josephine. The illustrated encyclopedia of Zen Buddhism. Rosen, 2002. .
 Fischer-Schreiber, Ingrid, Stephan Schuhmacher, Gert Woerner. The encyclopedia of Eastern philosophy and religion: Buddhism, Hinduism, Taoism, Zen. Shambhala, 1989. .

Confucianism 
 Yao, Xinzhong. RoutledgeCurzon encyclopedia of Confucianism. Routledge, 2003. .

Taoism 
 Fischer-Schreiber, Ingrid, Stephan Schuhmacher, Gert Woerner. The encyclopedia of Eastern philosophy and religion: Buddhism, Hinduism, Taoism, Zen. Shambhala, 1989. .
 Fischer-Schreiber, Ingrid, Werner Wünsche. The Shambhala dictionary of Taoism. Shambhala, 1996. .
 Pas, Julian F., Man Kam Leung. Historical dictionary of Taoism. Scarecrow Press, 1998. .

Christianity 
 
 
 
 Bowden, John Stephen. Encyclopedia of Christianity. Oxford University Press, 2005. .
 
 
 
 Clifton, Chas. S. Encyclopedia of Heresies and Heretics. ABC-Clio, 1992.
 
 
 Day, Peter D. A dictionary of Christian denominations. Continuum, 2003. .
 
 Döpp, Siegmar, Wilhelm Geerlings, Matthew O'Connell. Dictionary of early Christian literature. Crossroad, 2000. .
 
 Evans, Craig A. Encyclopedia of the historical Jesus. Routledge, [2008]. .
 Geaves, Ron. Key words in Christianity. Georgetown University Press, 2006. .
 Harrington, Daniel J. Historical dictionary of Jesus. Scarecrow Press, 2010. .
 
 
 Johnston, William M., Claire Renkin. Encyclopedia of monasticism. Fitzroy Dearborn, 2000. .
 Klauser, Theodor, Franz Joseph Dölger, Hans Lietzmann. Reallexikon für Antike und Christentum: Sachwörterbuch zur Auseinandersetzung des Christentums mit der antiken Welt. Hiersemann, 1950–2007.
 Klenicki, Leon, Geoffrey Wigoder. A dictionary of the Jewish-Christian dialogue. Paulist Press, c1995. .
 Komonchak, Joseph. New Dictionary of Theology. Michael Glazier, 1987.
 
 
 
 
 
 
 Moreau, A. Scott, Harold A. Netland, Charles Edward van Engen. Evangelical dictionary of world missions. Baker Books; Paternoster Press, 2000. .
 
 
 Parry, Kenneth, John F. Hinnells. The Blackwell dictionary of Eastern Christianity. Blackwell, [2000]. .
 
 
 
 Reid, Daniel G. Dictionary of Christianity in America: A Comprehensive Resource on the Religious Impulse That Shaped a Continent. Intervarsity, 1990.
 
 
 
 Tiedemann, R. G. Reference guide to Christian missionary societies in China: From the sixteenth to the twentieth century. M.E. Sharpe, 2009. .
 Tischler, Nancy M. (2006), All things in the Bible: an encyclopedia of the biblical world, Greenwood Publishing, Westport, Conn. 2 vols, 808 pages. . Also available as free ebook.

Christian art 
 Giorgi, Rosa, Stefano Zuffi. Saints in art. J. Paul Getty Museum, 2003. .
 Rochelle, Mercedes. Post-Biblical saints art index: A locator of paintings, sculptures, mosaics, icons, frescoes, manuscript illuminations, sketches, woodcuts, and engravings, created from the 4th century to 1950, with a directory of the institutions holding them. McFarland, 1994. .
 Sill, Gertrude Grace. Handbook of Symbols in Christian Art. Macmillan, 1975.
 Speake, Jennifer. The Dent dictionary of symbols in Christian art. J. M. Dent, 1994. .

Biography 
 Anderson, Gerald H. Biographical dictionary of Christian missions. Macmillan Reference USA, 1998. .
 . Also available online here.
 Biographical dictionary of Chinese Christianity. Overseas Ministries Study Center, 2006–. Available online here.
 
 Carey, Patrick W., Joseph T. Lienhard. Biographical dictionary of Christian theologians. Greenwood Press, 2000. .
 
 Larsen, Timothy, D. W. Bebbington, Mark A. Noll. Biographical dictionary of evangelicals. InterVarsity Press, 2003. .
 
 Musser, Donald W., Joseph L. Price. A new handbook of Christian theologians. Abingdon Press, 1996. .
 Overseas Ministries Study Center. The dictionary of African Christian biography. Overseas Ministries Study Center, 2002–. Available online here.

Saints 
 
 
 
 
 
 
 
 
 Butler, Alban, Paul Burns. Butler's lives of the saints: Supplement of new saints and blesseds. Liturgical Press, 2005–. .
 Butler, Alban, David Hugh Farmer, Paul Burns. Butler's lives of the saints. Burns & Oates; Liturgical Press, 1995–2000. .
 
 
 
 Giorgi, Rosa, Stefano Zuffi. Saints in art. J. Paul Getty Museum, 2003. .
 Guiley, Rosemary. The encyclopedia of saints. Facts on File, 2001. .
 Ó Riain, Pádraig. A dictionary of Irish saints. Four Courts Press, c2011.
 Speake, Jennifer. The Dent dictionary of symbols in Christian art. J. M. Dent, 1994. .

Christian history 
 Di Bernardino, Angelo. Encyclopedia of the Early Church. Oxford University Press, 1992.
 Ferguson, Everett, Michael P. McHugh, Frederick W. Norris. Encyclopedia of early Christianity. Garland, 1998. .
 Hillerbrand, Hans Joachim. The Oxford encyclopedia of the Reformation. Oxford University Press, 1996. .
 Jouanna, Arlette. Histoire et dictionnaire des guerres de religion. R. Laffont, 1998. .
 Ollard, S. L., Gordon Crosse, Maurice Francis Bond. A dictionary of English church history. A.R. Mowbray; Morehouse-Gorham, [1948].

Christian liturgy and worship 
 Bradshaw, Paul F. The new Westminster dictionary of liturgy and worship. Westminster John Knox Press, 2002. .
 Pfatteicher, Philip H. A dictionary of liturgical terms. Trinity Press International, 1991. .

Roman Catholic liturgy and worship 
 Fink, Peter E. The new dictionary of sacramental worship. Liturgical Press, 1990. .
 Lang, Jovian. Dictionary of the liturgy. Catholic Book, 1989. .

Christian philosophy and theology 
 Carey, Patrick W., Joseph T. Lienhard. Biographical dictionary of Christian theologians. Greenwood Press, 2000. .
 Fabella, Virginia, R. S. Sugirtharajah. Dictionary of Third World theologies. Orbis Books, 2000. .
 González, Justo L., Carlos F. Cardoza-Orlandi, Suzanne E. Hoeferkamp Segovia. The Westminster dictionary of theologians. Westminster John Knox Press, 2006. .
 Hart, Trevor A., Richard Bauckham. The dictionary of historical theology. Paternoster Press; W. B. Eerdmans, 2000. .
 McGrath, Alister E. The Blackwell encyclopedia of modern Christian thought. Blackwell, 1993. .
 McGuckin, John Anthony. The Westminster handbook to patristic theology. Westminster John Knox Press, 2004. .
 McKim, Donald K. Westminster dictionary of theological terms. Westminster John Knox Press, 1996. .
 Muller, Richard A. Dictionary of Latin and Greek theological terms: Drawn principally from Protestant scholastic theology. Baker Book House, 1985. .
 Musser, Donald W., Joseph L. Price. New and enlarged handbook of Christian theology. Abingdon Press, 2003. .
 Musser, Donald W., Joseph L. Price. A new handbook of Christian theologians. Abingdon Press, 1996. .

Augustine of Hippo 
 Fitzgerald, Allan, John C. Cavadini. Augustine through the ages: An encyclopedia. W.B. Eerdmans, 1999. .
 Mayer, Cornelius Petrus, Erich Feldmann. Augustinus-Lexikon. Schwabe, 1986–1996. .

Christian ethics 
 Childress, James F. & John Macquarrie. The Westminster Dictionary of Christian Ethics. rev. ed., Westminster, 1986.
 Harrison, R. K. Encyclopedia of Biblical and Christian Ethics. rev. ed., Thomas Nelson, 1992.

Eastern Orthodox Church 
 Day, Peter D. The liturgical dictionary of Eastern Christianity. Liturgical Press, 1993. .
 
 Parry, Kenneth, John F. Hinnells. The Blackwell dictionary of Eastern Christianity. Blackwell, [2000]. .
 Prokurat, Michael, Alexander Golitzin, Michael D. Peterson. Historical dictionary of the Orthodox Church. Scarecrow Press, 1996. .

Evangelicals 
 Balmer, Randall Herbert. Encyclopedia of evangelicalism. Baylor University Press, 2004. .
 Hillerbrand, Hans Joachim. The encyclopedia of Protestantism. Routledge, 2004. .
 Krapohl, Robert H., Charles H. Lippy. The evangelicals: A historical, thematic, and biographical guide. Greenwood Press, 1999. .
 Larsen, Timothy, D. W. Bebbington, Mark A. Noll. Biographical dictionary of evangelicals. InterVarsity Press, 2003. .
 Lewis, Donald M. The Blackwell dictionary of evangelical biography: 1730–1860. Blackwell, 1995. .
 Moreau, A. Scott, Harold A. Netland, Charles Edward van Engen. Evangelical dictionary of world missions. Baker Books; Paternoster Press, 2000. .

Mormonism 
 Bitton, Davis. Historical dictionary of Mormonism. Scarecrow Press, 2000. .
 Hillerbrand, Hans Joachim. The encyclopedia of Protestantism. Routledge, 2004. .
 A Latter-Day Saint library: Including the encyclopedia of Mormonism/Church of Jesus Christ of Latter-Day Saints. Church of Jesus Christ of Latter-Day Saints. Infobases, 1998.
 Ludlow, Daniel H. Encyclopedia of Mormonism. Macmillan, 1992. .

Oriental Orthodox churches 
 Day, Peter D. The liturgical dictionary of Eastern Christianity. Liturgical Press, 1993. .
 Parry, Kenneth, John F. Hinnells. The Blackwell dictionary of Eastern Christianity. Blackwell, [2000]. .

Coptic Orthodox Church 
 Atiya, Aziz. The Coptic encyclopedia. Macmillan; Collier Macmillan Canada; Maxwell Macmillan International, 1991. .

Patrology 
 
 
 McGuckin, John Anthony. The Westminster handbook to patristic theology. Westminster John Knox Press, 2004. .

Protestantism 
 Hillerbrand, Hans Joachim. The encyclopedia of Protestantism. Routledge, 2004. .
 Melton, J. Gordon. Encyclopedia of Protestantism. Facts On File, 2005. .

Anabaptist–Mennonite 
 Dyck, Cornelius J., Dennis D. Martin. The Mennonite encyclopedia: A comprehensive reference work on the Anabaptist-Mennonite movement. Mennonite Brethren, 1955–1990. .

Anglican 
 Buchanan, Colin Ogilvie. Historical dictionary of Anglicanism. Scarecrow Press, 2006. .

Church of England 
 
 
 
 
 
 Ollard, S. L., Gordon Crosse, Maurice Francis Bond. A dictionary of English church history. A.R. Mowbray; Morehouse-Gorham, [1948].

Protestant Episcopal Church of the United States 
 
 
 
 Hein, David, Gardiner H. Shattuck. The Episcopalians. Praeger, 2004. .
 Wall, John N., Philippa J. Anderson. A dictionary for Episcopalians. Cowley Publications, 2000.

Baptists 
 Brackney, William H. Historical dictionary of the Baptists. Scarecrow Press, 2009. .
 
 Leonard, Bill. Dictionary of Baptists in America. InterVarsity Press, 1994. .

Brethren

Charismatic and Pentecostal Christianity 
 Burgess, Stanley. Dictionary of Charismatic and Pentecostal Movements. Zondervan, 1989.
 Burgess, Stanley M. Encyclopedia of Pentecostal and charismatic Christianity. Routledge, 2006. .
 Burgess, Stanley M., Ed M. Van der Maas. The new international dictionary of Pentecostal and charismatic movements. Zondervan, 2002. .
 DuPree, Sherry Sherrod. Biographical dictionary of African-American, Holiness-Pentecostals, 1880–1990. Middle Atlantic Regional Press, 1989. .

Church of Scotland

Lutheran 
 
 Gassmann, Günther, Duane H. Larson, Mark W. Oldenburg. Historical dictionary of Lutheranism. Scarecrow Press, 2001. .
 
 
 Wiederaenders, Robert C. Historical guide to Lutheran church bodies of North America. Lutheran Historical Conference, 1998.

Methodist 
 
 Methodist who's who. Culley, 1910.
 
 Yrigoyen, Charles, Susan E. Warrick. Historical dictionary of Methodism. Scarecrow Press, 2005. .

Holiness movement 
 DuPree, Sherry Sherrod. Biographical dictionary of African-American, Holiness-Pentecostals, 1880–1990. Middle Atlantic Regional Press, 1989. .
 Kostlevy, William. Historical dictionary of the Holiness movement. Scarecrow Press, 2009. .

Quakers 
 Abbott, Margery Post, Mary ELlen Chijioke, Pink Dandelion. Historical dictionary of the Friends (Quakers). Scarecrow Press, 2003. .
Hinshaw, William Wade, Thomas Worth Marshall. Encyclopedia of American Quaker genealogy. Genealogical Pub., 1991. .

Reformed 
 Benedetto, Robert, Donald K. McKim. Historical dictionary of the Reformed Churches. Scarecrow Press, 2010. .
 McKim, Donald K., David F. Wright. Encyclopedia of the Reformed faith. Westminster/John Knox Press; Saint Andrew Press, 1992. .

Congregationalism 
 Peel, Albert. The Congregational two hundred, 1530–1948. Independent Press, [1948].

Seventh-day Adventism 
 Land, Gary. Historical dictionary of Seventh-Day Adventists. Scarecrow Press, 2005. .

Shakers 
 Duffield, Holley Gene. Historical dictionary of the Shakers. Scarecrow Press, 2000. .

Unitarian Universalism 
 Harris, Mark W. Historical dictionary of Unitarian Universalism. Scarecrow Press, 2004. .

United Church of Christ

Roman Catholic Church 
 
 Annuario pontificio per l'anno. Tipografia poliglotta vaticana, 1912–. .
 
 
 
 Broderick, Robert. The Catholic Encyclopedia. rev. ed., Thomas Nelson, 1987.
 Bunson, Matthew, Margaret Bunson, Timothy M. Dolan. OSV's encyclopedia of Catholic history. Our Sunday Visitor, 2004. .
 
 Collinge, William J. Historical dictionary of Catholicism. Scarecrow Press, 1997. .
 Coppa, Frank J. Encyclopedia of the Vatican and papacy. Greenwood Press, 1999. .
 Coulter, Michael L. Encyclopedia of Catholic social thought, social science, and social policy. Scarecrow Press, 2007. .
 
 
 Glazier, Michael, Monika Hellwig. The modern Catholic encyclopedia. Liturgical Press, 2004. .
 
 McBrien, Richard P., Harold W. Attridge. The HarperCollins encyclopedia of Catholicism. HarperCollins, 1995. .
 
 Murray, Alan V. The Crusades: An encyclopedia. ABC-CLIO, 2006. .
 
 New Catholic encyclopedia. Thomson/Gale; Catholic University of America, 2003. .

Biography 
 
 
 
 
 Lentz, Harris M. Popes and cardinals of the 20th century: A biographical dictionary. McFarland, 2002. .

Roman Catholic popes 
 Coppa, Frank J. Encyclopedia of the Vatican and papacy. Greenwood Press, 1999. .
 Coppa, Frank J. The great popes through history: An encyclopedia. Greenwood Press, 2002. .
 Kelly, J. N. D., Michael Walsh. The Oxford dictionary of Popes. Oxford University Press, 2006. .
 Levillain, Philippe. The papacy: An encyclopedia. Routledge, 2002. .

Documents

Eastern Catholicism 
 Day, Peter D. The liturgical dictionary of Eastern Christianity. Liturgical Press, 1993. .
 Parry, Kenneth, John F. Hinnells. The Blackwell dictionary of Eastern Christianity. Blackwell, [2000]. .

Religious orders

Roman Catholic liturgy and worship 
 Lang, Jovian. Dictionary of the liturgy. Catholic Book, 1989. .

Hinduism 
 
 Fischer-Schreiber, Ingrid, Stephan Schuhmacher, Gert Woerner. The encyclopedia of Eastern philosophy and religion: Buddhism, Hinduism, Taoism, Zen. Shambhala, 1989. .
 Geaves, Ron. Key words in Hinduism. Georgetown University Press, 2006. .
 Jacobsen, Knut A., Helene Basu, Angelika Malinar, Vasudha Narayanan. Brill's encyclopedia of Hinduism. Brill, 2009–. .
 Johnson, W. J. A dictionary of Hinduism. Oxford University Press, 2009. .
 Klostermaier, Klaus K. A concise encyclopedia of Hinduism. Oneworld, 1998. .
 Meister, Michael W., Madhusudan A. Dhaky American Institute of Indian Studies. Encyclopedia of Indian temple architecture. Philadelphia: American Institute of Indian Studies; University of Pennsylvania Press, 1983–. .
 
 Sullivan, Bruce M. The A to Z of Hinduism. Scarecrow Press, 2001. .
 Sullivan, Bruce M. Historical dictionary of Hinduism. Scarecrow Press, 1997. .
 
 India Heritage Research Foundation (IHRF). Encyclopedia of Hinduism. Mandala Publishing, 2013.

Islam 
 Adamec, Ludwig W. Historical dictionary of Islam. Scarecrow Press, 2001. .
 Alam, Mohammad Manzoor, Z. M. Khan. 100 great Muslim leaders of the 20th century. Institute of Objective Studies, 2005. .
 
 Behn, Wolfgang. Concise biographical companion to index Islamicus: An international who's who in Islamic studies from its beginnings down to the twentieth century: Bio-bibliographical supplement to index Islamicus, 1665–1980. Brill, 2004–2006. .
 Bewley, Aisha Abdurrahman. Muslim women: A biographical dictionary. Ta-Ha, 2004. .
 
 Clements, Frank. Historical dictionary of Arab and Islamic organizations. Scarecrow Press, 2001. .
 Coughlin, Kathryn M. Muslim cultures today: A reference guide. Greenwood Press, 2006. .
 E. J. Brill's First Encyclopedia of Islam, 1913–1936, E. J. Brill, 1993.
 Esposito, John L. The Oxford dictionary of Islam. Oxford University Press, 2003. .
 Esposito, John L. The Oxford encyclopedia of the modern Islamic world. Oxford University Press, 1995. .
 Geaves, Ron. Key words in Islam. Georgetown University Press, 2006. .
 Ghazanfar, Shaikh M. Islamic civilization: History, contributions, and influence: A compendium of literature. Scarecrow Press, 2006. .
 
 
 Glasse, Cyril. Concise Encyclopedia of Islam. HarperCollins, 1989.
 
 Houtsma, Th., M. Seligsohn, T. W. Arnold, and A. Schaade. Encyclopedia of Islam. Brill, 1908–10.
 
 Joseph, Suad, Afsaneh Najmabadi. Encyclopedia of women and Islamic cultures. Brill, 2003–2007. .
 Kramme, U., Ž. Urra Muena. Arab-Islamic biographical archive (AIBA). K. G. Saur, 1994–2002. .
 Leaman, Oliver. The biographical encyclopedia of Islamic philosophy. Thoemmes Continuum, 2006. .
 Madelung, Wilferd, Farhad Daftary, Kāẓim Mūsavī Bujnūrdī. Encyclopaedia Islamica. Brill, in association with The Institute of Ismaili Studies, 2009–. .
 Mawṣililī, Ahmad. Historical dictionary of Islamic fundamentalist movements in the Arab world, Iran, and Turkey. Scarecrow Press, 1999. .
 
 Meri, Josef W., Jere L. Bacharach. Medieval Islamic civilization: An encyclopedia. Routledge, 2006. .
 Netton, Ian Richard. A popular dictionary of Islam. Humanities Press International, 1992. .
 Noegel, Scott B., Brannon M. Wheeler. Historical dictionary of prophets in Islam and Judaism. Scarecrow Press, 2002. .
 Petersen, Andrew. Dictionary of Islamic architecture. Routledge, 1996. .
 
 Shaikh, Farzana. Islam and Islamic Groups: A Worldwide Reference Guide. Gale Research, 1992.
 Singh, Nagendra Kr. Encyclopaedia of Muslim biography: India, Pakistan, Bangladesh. A. P. H., 2001. .
 Weekes, Richard V. Muslim peoples: A world ethnographic survey. Greenwood Press, 1984. .

Qur'an 
 Leaman, Oliver. The Qur'ān: An encyclopedia. Routledge, 2006. .
 McAuliffe, Jane Dammen et al. (2001–2006), Encyclopaedia of the Qur'an, 1st Edition., 5 vols, c. 2,500 pages, plus index., Leiden: Brill Publishers. .
 Mir, Mustansir. Dictionary of Qur'ānic terms and concepts. Garland, 1987. .

Sufism 
 Renard, John. Historical dictionary of Sufism. Scarecrow Press, 2005. .

Jainism 
 Chanchreek, K. L., Mahesh K. Jain. Encyclopedia of Jain Religion. Shree Publishers and Distributors, 2005. .
 Wiley, Kristi L. Historical dictionary of Jainism. Scarecrow Press, 2004. .

Judaism 
 Alpher, Joseph. Encyclopedia of Jewish History: Events and Eras of the Jewish History. Facts on File, 1986.
 
 Birnbaum, Philip. A book of Jewish concepts. Hebrew, [1975]. .
 Cohn-Sherbok, Dan. Blackwell Dictionary of Judaica. Blackwell, 1992.
 Edelheit, Hershel, Abraham J. Edelheit. History of Zionism: A handbook and dictionary. Westview, [2000]. .
 
 
 
 
 
 
 Fischel, Jack and Sanford Pinsker. Jewish-American History and Culture: An Encyclopedia. Garland, 1992.
 Frankel, Ellen and Betsy Platin Teutsch. Encyclopedia of Jewish Symbols. Jason Aronson, 1992.
 Geaves, Ron. Key words in Judaism. Georgetown University Press, 2006. .
 
 Klenicki, Leon, Geoffrey Wigoder. A dictionary of the Jewish-Christian dialogue. Paulist Press, c1995. .
 
 Lévy, Joseph Josy, Marc Eliany, Josué Elkouby. Dictionnaire biographique du monde juif sépharade et méditérranéen. Éditions Élysée, [2001]. .
 
 Medoff, Rafael, Chaim Isaac Waxman. Historical dictionary of Zionism. Scarecrow Press, 2000. .
 Neusner, Jacob, Alan J. Avery-Peck, William Scott Green. The encyclopaedia of Judaism. Brill, 2005. .
 Noegel, Scott B., Brannon M. Wheeler. Historical dictionary of prophets in Islam and Judaism. Scarecrow Press, 2002. .
 
 Roth, Cecil & Geoffrey Wigoder. Encyclopedia Judaica. Kester, 1982.
 Schiffman, Lawrence H., James C. VanderKam. Encyclopedia of the Dead Sea scrolls. Oxford University Press, 2000. .
 
 , 12 vols, over 18,000 articles. . Free online access available.
 Skolnik, Fred, Michael Berenbaum. Encyclopaedia Judaica. Macmillan Reference USA; Keter, 2007. .
 Solomon, Nathan. Historical dictionary of Judaism. Scarecrow Press, 2006. .
 
 Wigoder, Geoffrey. Encyclopedia of Judaism. Macmillan, 1989.
 Wigoder, Geoffrey. Encyclopedic Dictionary of Judaica. Keter, 1974.
 
 Wigoder, Geoffrey. New encyclopedia of Zionism and Israel. Fairleigh Dickinson University Press; Associated University Presses, 1994. .

Biography 
 Cohn-Sherbok, Dan. The dictionary of Jewish biography. Oxford University Press, 2005. .
 Hyman, Paula, Deborah Dash Moore, Phyllis Holman Weisbard. Jewish women in America: An historical encyclopedia. Routledge, 1997. .
 
 Lévy, Joseph Josy, Marc Eliany, Josué Elkouby. Dictionnaire biographique du monde juif sépharade et méditérranéen. Éditions Élysée, [2001]. . Also available on the internet as Dictionnaire Biographique du Monde Juif Sépharade et Méditérranéen, here
 Marcus, Jacob Rader, Judith M. Daniels. The concise dictionary of American Jewish biography. Carlson Publ., 1994. .
 Morgenstern, Hans. Jüdisches biographisches Lexikon: eine Sammlung von bedeutenden Persönlichkeiten jüdischer Herkunft ab 1800. Berlin Münster: Lit, 2011. .
 Polner, Murray. American Jewish biographies. Facts on File, [1982]. .
 
 Who's who in Israel and Jewish personalities from all over the world. Bronfman, 1945–2001.
 Who's who in world Jewry. Pitman, 1955–1988. .

Handbooks

History 
 Abramson, Glenda, Dovid Katz. The Blackwell companion to Jewish culture: From the eighteenth century to the present. Blackwell Reference, 1989. .
 Gribetz, Judah. Timetables of Jewish History: A Chronology of the Most Important People and Events in Jewish History. Simon & Schuster, 1993.
 Kantor, Mattis. Jewish Time Line Encyclopedia. Jason Aronson, 1989.
 Neusner, Jacob, William Scott Green.Dictionary of Judaism in the biblical period: 450 B.C.E. to 600 C.E. Macmillan Library Reference, 1996. .
 Shamir, Ilana and Shlomo Shavit. Young Reader's Encyclopedia of Jewish History. Viking Kestral, 1987.
 Spector, Shmuel, Geoffrey Wigoder. The encyclopedia of Jewish life before and during the Holocaust. Yad Vashem; New York University Press, 2001. .

Native American religions 
 Bastian, Dawn E., Judy K. Mitchell. Handbook of Native American mythology. ABC-CLIO, 2004. .
 Crawford, Suzanne J., Dennis F. Kelley. American Indian religious traditions: An encyclopedia. ABC-CLIO, 2005. .
 Gill, Sam and Irene Sullivan. Dictionary of Native American Mythology. ABC-Clio, 1992.
 Hirschfelder, Arlene B., Paulette Fairbanks Molin, Walter R. Echo-Hawk. Encyclopedia of Native American religions: An introduction. Facts On File, 2000. .
 Johnson, Troy R. Distinguished Native American spiritual practitioners and healers. Oryx Press, 2002. .
 Lyon, William S. Encyclopedia of Native American healing. ABC-CLIO, 1996. .
 Lyon, William S. Encyclopedia of Native American shamanism: Sacred ceremonies of North America. ABC-CLIO, 1998. .

New religious movements 
 Chryssides, George D. Historical dictionary of new religious movements. Scarecrow Press, 2001. .
 Clarke, Peter B. Encyclopedia of new religious movements. Routledge, 2006. .
 Lewis, James R. The encyclopedia of cults, sects, and new religions. Prometheus Books, 2002. .
 Melton, J. Gordon. Biographical dictionary of American cult and sect leaders. Garland, 1986. .
 Melton, J. Gordon. Encyclopedic Handbook of Cults in America. 2nd ed., Garland, 1992. .
 Melton, J. Gordon, Jerome Clark, Aidan A. Kelly. New Age encyclopedia: A guide to the beliefs, concepts, terms, people, and organizations that make up the new global movement toward spiritual development, health and healing, higher consciousness, and related subjects. Gale Research, 1990. .
 Partridge, Christopher H. New religions: a guide: New religious movements, sects, and alternative spiritualities. Oxford University Press, 2004. .

Wicca and witchcraft 
 Encyclopedia of Witchcraft and Demonology. Crown, 1959.
 Guiley, Rosemary Ellen. The Encyclopedia of Witches and Witchcraft. Facts on File, 1989.

Philosophy of religion 
 Brown, Stephen F., Juan Carlos Flores. Historical dictionary of medieval philosophy and theology. Scarecrow Press, 2007. .
 MacGregor, Geddes.Dictionary of religion and philosophy. Paragon House, 1989. .
 Russell, Letty M., J. Shannon Clarkson. Dictionary of feminist theologies. Westminster John Knox Press, 1996. .
 Thiselton, Anthony C. A concise encyclopedia of the philosophy of religion. Baker Academic, 2005. .

Religion by region

African religion 
 Glazier, Stephen D. Encyclopedia of African and African-American religions. Routledge, 2001. .

European religion

English religion 
 Ollard, S. L., Gordon Crosse, Maurice Francis Bond. A dictionary of English church history. A.R. Mowbray; Morehouse-Gorham, [1948].

North American religion 
 Keller, Rosemary Skinner, Rosemary Radford Ruether, Marie Cantlon. Encyclopedia of women and religion in North America. Indiana University Press, 2006. .

American (U.S.) religion 
 Benowitz, June Melby. Encyclopedia of American women and religion. ABC-CLIO, 1998. .
 Bowden, Henry Warner. Dictionary of American religious biography. Greenwood Press, 1993. .
 De La Torre, Miguel A. Hispanic American religious cultures. ABC-CLIO, 2009. .
 Fischel, Jack and Sanford Pinsker. Jewish-American History and Culture: An Encyclopedia. Garland, 1992.
 Hill, Samuel S. Encyclopedia of Religion in the South. Mercer University Press, 1984.
 Krapohl, Robert H., Charles H. Lippy. The evangelicals: A historical, thematic, and biographical guide. Greenwood Press, 1999. .
 Leonard, Bill. Dictionary of Baptists in America. InterVarsity Press, 1994. .
 Lippy, Charles H., Peter W. Williams. Encyclopedia of religion in America. CQ Press, 2010. .
 Lippy, Charles S. & Peter W. Williams. Encyclopedia of the American Religious Experience: Studies of Traditions and Movements. Scribner's, 1988.
 Meadth, Frank. Handbook of Denominations in the United States. Abingdon, 1990.
 Melton, J. Gordon. Biographical dictionary of American cult and sect leaders. Garland, 1986. .
 Melton, J. Gordon. The Encyclopedia of American Religions. 4th ed., Gale Research, 1992.
 Melton, J. Gordon, James Sauer. The encyclopedia of American religions, religious creeds: A compilation of more than 450 creeds, confessions, statements of faith, and summaries of doctrine of religious and spiritual groups in the United States and Canada. Gale Research, 1988–1994. .
 Melton, J. Gordon. Encyclopedic Handbook of Cults in America. 2nd ed., Garland, 1992. .
 Melton, J. Gordon, James A. Beverley, Constance M. Jones, Pamela Susan Nadell. Melton's encyclopedia of American religions. Gale Cengage Learning, 2009. .
 Melton, J. Gordon. Religious leaders of America. Gale Research, 1991–. .
 Murphy, Larry, J. Gordon Melton, Gary L. Ward. Encyclopedia of African American Religions. Garland, 1993.
 Piepkorn, Arthur. Profiles in Belief: The Religious Bodies of the United States and Canada. Harper, 1977–79.
 Queen, Edward L., Stephen R. Prothero, Gardiner H. Shattuck. Encyclopedia of American religious history. Facts on File, 2001. .
 Reid, Daniel G. Dictionary of Christianity in America: A Comprehensive Resource on the Religious Impulse That Shaped a Continent. Intervarsity, 1990.
 Roof, Wade Clark.Contemporary American religion. Macmillan Reference USA, 2000. .
 Shriver, George H., Bill Leonard. Encyclopedia of religious controversies in the United States. Greenwood Press, 1997. .
 Wiederaenders, Robert C. Historical guide to Lutheran church bodies of North America. Lutheran Historical Conference, 1998.
 Williamson, William. Encyclopedia of Religions in the United States: One Hundred Religious Groups Speak for Themselves. Crossroad, 1992.

African-American religion 
 DuPree, Sherry Sherrod. Biographical dictionary of African-American, Holiness-Pentecostals, 1880–1990. Middle Atlantic Regional Press, 1989. .
 Glazier, Stephen D. Encyclopedia of African and African-American religions. Routledge, 2001. .
 Payne, Wardell J. Directory of African American religious bodies: A compendium by the Howard University School of Divinity. Howard University Press, 1995. .

Canadian religion 
 Piepkorn, Arthur. Profiles in Belief: The Religious Bodies of the United States and Canada. Harper, 1977–79.

Bolivian religion 
 Candia, Antonio Paredes. Diccionario mitológico de Bolivia: Dioses, símbolos, héroes. Ediciones Isla; Librería-Editorial Popular, 1981.

Religious education 
 Cully, Iris V. & Kendig Brubaker. Harper's Encyclopedia of Religious Education. HarperCollins, 1990.

Religious music 
 Foley, Edward, Mark Paul Bangert. Worship music: A concise dictionary. Liturgical Press, 2000. .
 Swain, Joseph Peter. Historical dictionary of sacred music. Scarecrow Press, 2006. .

Christian music 
 
 Poultney, David. Dictionary of Western Church Music. American Library Association, 1991.

Science and religion 
 Ecker, Ronald L. Dictionary of Science and Creationism. Prometheus Books, 1990.
 van Huyssteen, Wentzel. Encyclopedia of science and religion. Macmillan Reference, 2003. .

Shinto 
 Picken, Stuart D. B. The A to Z of Shinto. Scarecrow Press, 2006. .

Sikhism 
 Cole, W. Owen, Piara Singh Sambhi. A popular dictionary of Sikhism. NTC Pub. Group, 1997. .
 Dogra, R. C., Urmila Dogra. The Sikh world: An encyclopaedic survey of Sikh religion and culture. UBSPD, 2003. .
 The Encyclopaedia of Sikhism. Punjabi University, 1992–1998. .
 McLeod, W. H. Historical dictionary of Sikhism. Scarecrow Press, 2005. .

Footnotes

References 
 
 Kister, Kenneth F. (1994). Kister's Best Encyclopedias (2nd ed.). Phoenix: Oryx. .
 Kroeger, Alice Bertha, Isadore Gilbert Mudge. (1911). Guide to the Study and Use of Reference Books. Chicago: American Library Association.

See also 
 Bibliography of encyclopedias

Bibliography of encyclopedias
Religion
Lists of books about religion